Laura Almaral Palafox (born February 23, 1960 in Guadalajara) is a retired female beach volleyball player from Mexico, who won the bronze medal in the women's beach team competition at the 1999 Pan American Games in Winnipeg, Manitoba, Canada, partnering Mayra Huerta.

References

1960 births
Living people
Mexican beach volleyball players
Mexican women's beach volleyball players
Beach volleyball players at the 1999 Pan American Games
Sportspeople from Guadalajara, Jalisco
Pan American Games bronze medalists for Mexico
Pan American Games medalists in volleyball
Central American and Caribbean Games gold medalists for Mexico
Competitors at the 1998 Central American and Caribbean Games
Central American and Caribbean Games medalists in beach volleyball
Medalists at the 1999 Pan American Games